Women's Downhill World Cup 1969/1970

Final point standings

In Women's Downhill World Cup 1969/70 the best 3 results count.

External links
 

Women's Downhill
FIS Alpine Ski World Cup women's downhill discipline titles